In mathematics, a basis of a matroid is a maximal independent set of the matroid—that is, an independent set that is not contained in any other independent set.

Examples 
As an example, consider the matroid over the ground-set R2 (the vectors in the two-dimensional Euclidean plane), with the following independent sets:   It has two bases, which are the sets  {(0,1),(2,0)} ,  {(0,3),(2,0)}. These are the only independent sets that are maximal under inclusion.

The basis has a specialized name in several specialized kinds of matroids:

 In a graphic matroid, where the independent sets are the forests, the bases are called the spanning forests of the graph. 
 In a transversal matroid, where the independent sets are endpoints of matchings in a given bipartite graph, the bases are called transversals. 
 In a linear matroid, where the independent sets are the linearly-independent sets of vectors in a given vector-space, the bases are just called bases of the vector space.  Hence, the concept of basis of a matroid generalizes the concept of basis from linear algebra.  
In a uniform matroid, where the independent sets are all sets with cardinality at most k (for some integer k), the bases are all sets with cardinality exactly k.  
In a partition matroid, where elements are partitioned into categories and the independent sets are all sets containing at most kc elements from each category c, the bases are all sets which contain exactly kc elements from category c.  
In a free matroid, where all subsets of the ground-set E are independent, the unique basis is E.

Properties

Exchange 
All matroids satisfy the following properties, for any two distinct bases  and :

 Basis-exchange property: if , then there exists an element  such that  is a basis. 
Brualdi showed that it is in fact equivalent to the basis-exchange property. 
Brylawski, Greene, and Woodall, showed (independently) that it is in fact equivalent to the basis-exchange property. 
Brualdi showed that it is equivalent to the basis-exchange property. 
Partition basis-exchange property: For each partition  of  into m parts, there exists a partition  of  into m parts, such that for every ,  is a basis.

However, a basis-exchange property that is both symmetric and bijective is not satisfied by all matroids: it is satisfied only by base-orderable matroids.

In general, in the symmetric basis-exchange property, the element  need not be unique.

Cardinality 
It follows from the basis exchange property that no member of  can be a proper subset of another.

Moreover, all bases of a given matroid have the same cardinality. In a linear matroid, the cardinality of all bases is called the dimension of the vector space.

Neil  White's conjecture 
It is conjectured that all matroids satisfy the following property: For every integer t ≥ 1, If B and B' are two t-tuples of bases with the same multi-set union, then there is a sequence of symmetric exchanges that transforms B to B'.

Characterization 
The bases of a matroid characterize the matroid completely: a set is independent if and only if it is a subset of a basis.

(B1) There is at least one base --  is nonempty;

(B2) implies that, given any two bases A and B, we can transform A into B by a sequence of exchanges of a single element. In particular, this implies that all bases must have the same cardinality.

Duality 
It can be verified that  is indeed a matroid.

Circuits 
A dual notion to a basis is a circuit. A circuit in a matroid is a minimal dependent set—that is, a dependent set whose proper subsets are all independent.  The terminology arises because the circuits of graphic matroids are cycles in the corresponding graphs.

(C1) The empty set is not a circuit;
(C2) A subset of a circuit is not a circuit;
(C3) If C1 and C2 are circuits, and x is an element in their intersection, then  contains a circuit.

Another property of circuits is that, if a set  is independent, and the set  is dependent (i.e., adding the element  makes it dependent), then  contains a unique circuit , and it contains . This circuit is called the fundamental circuit of  w.r.t. . It is analogous to the linear algebra fact, that if adding a vector  to an independent vector set  makes it dependent, then there is a unique linear combination of elements of  that equals .

See also 

 Matroid polytope - a polytope in Rn (where n is the number of elements in the matroid), whose vertices are indicator vectors of the bases of the matroid.

References 

Matroid theory